The Hausdorff Center for Mathematics (HCM) is a research center in Bonn, formed by the four mathematical institutes of the Rheinische Friedrich-Wilhelms-Universität Bonn (Mathematical Institute, Institute for Applied Mathematics, Institute for Numerical Simulation, Research Institute for Discrete Mathematics), the Max Planck Institute for Mathematics (MPIM), and the Institute for Social and Economic Sciences.

History 
The Hausdorff Center was established in 2006 as one of the seventeen national Clusters of Excellence that were part of the German government's Excellence Initiative. It was officially opened with a colloquium on 19 and 20 January 2007. In 2012, a second funding period was granted. The Hausdorff Center is the only cluster of excellence in the area of mathematics in Germany. It was ranked 14th in the world for mathematics by the Academic Ranking of World Universities in 2021.

The center is named after the mathematician Felix Hausdorff (born 8 November 1868; died 26 January 1942).

Organization 
The coordinator of the HCM is Karl-Theodor Sturm. Altogether, about 70 professors from Bonn are affiliated with the HCM: all professors for Mathematics, of the MPI, and for Theoretical Economy.  These include the director of the MPI, Gerd Faltings, who was awarded the Fields Medal in 1986, and Peter Scholze, who was awarded the Fields Medal in 2018.

The Hausdorff Research Institute for Mathematics (HIM), the Bonn International Graduate School in Mathematics (BIGS), and the Hausdorff School for Advanced Studies in Mathematics are part of the Hausdorff Center:

 The Hausdorff Research Institute for Mathematics (HIM) organizes international long-term programs and fosters cooperations between German mathematicians and internationally renowned scientists in mathematics and mathematical economics. It also runs specific programs for young scientists. Director of the HIM is Christoph Thiele.
 The Bonn International Graduate School in Mathematics (BIGS) supports the scientific development of PhD students. Director of the BIGS is Barbara Niethammer.
 The Hausdorff School for Advanced Studies in Mathematics is a training program for postdoctoral researchers based in Germany and worldwide. It fosters the systematic qualification of young scientists. Director is Patrik Ferrari.

References

External links 

 Hausdorff Center for Mathematics, Official Website 
 Hausdorff Research Institute for Mathematics 
 Bonn International Graduate School for Mathematics

Mathematical institutes
Research institutes in Germany
Bonn